Joseph W. Hubbell (October 12, 1800 – February 13, 1884) was a member of the Connecticut House of Representatives from Norwalk from 1839 to 1841, and the first Warden of the Borough of Norwalk after its incorporation. He served from 1836 to 1839, from 1840 to 1842 and from 1855 to 1856.

He was born on October 12, 1800, the son of Aaron Hubbell and Sarah Silliman.

References 

1800 births
1884 deaths
Mayors of Norwalk, Connecticut
Members of the Connecticut House of Representatives
19th-century American politicians